Gadzhi Gadzhiyevich Gadzhiyev (born 27 March 1991) is a former Russian footballer.

Career
Gadzhiyev made his professional debut for Anzhi Makhachkala on 14 July 2010 in the Russian Cup game against FC Pskov-747.

External links

References

1991 births
Living people
Russian footballers
Association football midfielders
FC Anzhi Makhachkala players
Russian people of Dagestani descent
20th-century Russian people
21st-century Russian people